Steven Donald Larmer (born June 16, 1961) is a Canadian former professional ice hockey forward. He is the brother of Jeff Larmer.

Career
As a youth, Larmer played in the 1974 Quebec International Pee-Wee Hockey Tournament with a minor ice hockey team from Peterborough, Ontario.

Steve Larmer played in the NHL for the Chicago Blackhawks and New York Rangers and was known as one of the NHL's best power forwards of that era. He won the 1983 Calder Memorial Trophy as well as being named to the NHL All-Rookie Team that year. From 1982 to 1993, Larmer played in 884 consecutive games for the Blackhawks, an NHL record for most consecutive games played with the same team, and the third longest consecutive-games streak in league history at that time. He had a chance at breaking Doug Jarvis' record for consecutive games played but a contract dispute at the beginning of the 1993–94 officially ended his streak. The impasse was resolved by Larmer being traded to the New York Rangers, who would go on to win the Stanley Cup that same year. Larmer was selected to play in Pittsburgh in the 1990 All-Star Game, and in Chicago's 1991 All-Star Game as well. In the 1990-91 season he finished 5th in the voting for NHL league MVP. Larmer was great at both ends of the ice as he received Frank J. Selke Trophy votes on five occasions (1989-17th, 1991-3rd, 1992-8th, 1993-10th, 1994-13th) as best defensive forward in the league. He received votes for the Lady Byng Memorial Trophy on five occasions. He won a Stanley Cup with the Rangers in 1994, where he served as alternate captain, and scored his 1,000th point and played in his 1,000th game in 1994–95, his final season.

Larmer was a member of the 1991 Canada Cup team for Canada and played on team's top line with Wayne Gretzky where Larmer led the entire competition in goals (6) and ranked second in points (11) behind only Gretzky.

Career statistics

Regular season and playoffs

International

Awards and achievements

Individual awards
Calder Memorial Trophy – 1983
NHL All-Rookie Team - 1983
1990 NHL All-Star
1991 NHL All-Star

Team awards
1982 Calder Cup Champion with New Brunswick Hawks
1991 Canada Cup Gold Medalist with Team Canada
1991 Silver Medalist with Team Canada
1994 Stanley Cup Champion with New York Rangers

NHL accolades
Led NHL in Games Played for 11 Consecutive Seasons (1982-83 - 1992-1993)
Led NHL in Shooting % with 31.3% (1990–91) 
Top 10 in Goals (1984–85)
Top 10 in Assists (1986–87)
Top 10 in Points (1990–91)
3 time Top 10 in Shorthanded Goals (1987–88) (1992–93) (1993–94)
4 time Top 10 in Power-Play Goals (1984–85) (1987–88) (1988–89) (1990–91)
2 time Top 10 on Plus/Minus (1982–83) (1990–91)
2 time Top 10 in Game Winning Goals (1982–83) (1990–91)
3 time Top 10 in Hat Tricks (1982–83) (1991–92) (1992–93)
Top 10 in Shooting % (1984–85)
5 times (+20 Plus/Minus)
9 times (30+ Goals)
5 times (40+ Goals)
10 times (40+ Assists)
3 times (55+ Assists)
11 times (70+ Points)
9 times (75+ Points)
7 times (80+ Points)
3 times (90+ Points)
(100+ Points)
9 Hat Tricks (Regular Season)

NHL records 
Most Game Winning Goals by a Rookie in a Single Season (9)
Most Consecutive Games Played by a Right Winger in Regular Season History (884)

See also
 List of NHL players with 100-point seasons

References

Kreiser, John and Friedman, Lou (1996), "The New York Rangers", Sports Publishing LLC,

External links
 

1961 births
Living people
Calder Trophy winners
Canadian ice hockey right wingers
Chicago Blackhawks draft picks
Chicago Blackhawks players
Ice hockey people from Ontario
National Hockey League All-Stars
New Brunswick Hawks players
New York Rangers players
Niagara Falls Flyers players
Peterborough Petes (ice hockey) players
Sportspeople from Peterborough, Ontario
Stanley Cup champions